Henri Rouquet (born 22 March 1942) is a French diver. He competed in the men's 10 metre platform event at the 1960 Summer Olympics.

References

External links
 
 

1942 births
Living people
French male divers
Olympic divers of France
Divers at the 1960 Summer Olympics
Sportspeople from Bordeaux
20th-century French people